Serhiy Viktorovych Doronchenko (born 26 November 1966) is a Ukrainian-Russian professional football functionary and a former player.

Career
He started playing in professional football as part of FC Kuban Krasnodar in the First League of the USSR Championship. In 1985, spent one match in the major leagues for the SKA from Rostov-on-Don. 

Since 2008, he has held the position of sports director in FC Kuban Krasnodar. In March 2011, he was embroiled in a scandal, after the former FC  Kuban player Nikola Nikezić announced that he was forced to terminate the contract with his threats.

References

External links
 

1966 births
Sportspeople from Vladikavkaz
Living people
Soviet footballers
Association football midfielders
Ukrainian footballers
Ukrainian expatriate footballers
Russian Premier League players
Expatriate footballers in Bulgaria
Expatriate footballers in Russia
Expatriate footballers in Kazakhstan
FC Kuban Krasnodar players
FC SKA Rostov-on-Don players
PFC Krylia Sovetov Samara players
FK Neftchi Farg'ona players
Pakhtakor Tashkent FK players
FC Lokomotiv Nizhny Novgorod players
Navbahor Namangan players
FC Vorskla Poltava players
FC Etar Veliko Tarnovo players
FC Lada-Tolyatti players
FC Rubin Kazan players
FC Naftovyk-Ukrnafta Okhtyrka players
FC Shakhter Karagandy players
FC SKA-Khabarovsk players
Russian football chairmen and investors